Rita Marchisio (born 13 February 1950 in Cuneo) is a former long-distance runner from Italy

Biography
She won the inaugural Osaka Ladies Marathon on 24 January 1982 in an Italian record time of 2:32:55 hours. More than a year later the record was broken by Laura Fogli in the New York City Marathon: 2:31:49.

Achievements

External links
 

1950 births
Living people
Italian female long-distance runners
Italian female marathon runners
Place of birth missing (living people)
World Athletics Championships athletes for Italy
20th-century Italian women
21st-century Italian women